Andromachi was a  cargo ship that was built as Empire Favour in 1945 by Caledon Shipbuilding & Engineering Co Ltd, Dundee for the Ministry of War Transport (MoWT). She was sold in 1947 and renamed Epsom. Sales in 1950 saw her renamed Tharros and Errington Court. In 1956, she was sold to Liberia and renamed Penelope. A further sale in 1961 saw her renamed Andromachi. She was set afire at Suez in June 1969 during the War of Attrition and was abandoned. The wreck was scrapped in 1976.

Description
Caledon Shipbuilding & Engineering Company Ltd, Dundee, United Kingdom built the ship in 1944 as yard number 411.

The engine was built by Duncan Steward & Co Ltd, Glasgow. It drove a single screw propeller.

History
The ship was built by Caledon Shipbuilding & Engineering Company Ltd, Dundee, United Kingdom. She was launched on 22 August 1945 and completed in November. Built for the MOWT, she was placed under the management of Clarke & Service. Her United Kingdom official number was 188221 and her port of registry was Dundee.

Empire Favour was sold in 1947 to the Britain Steamship Co Ltd and was renamed Epsom. She was operated under the management of Watts, Watts & Co Ltd. Her port of registry was London. In 1950. Epsom was sold to Tharros Shipping Co Ltd and was renamed Tharros. She was operated under the management of John Livens & Sons Ltd., London. Later that year, Epsom was sold to Court Line, renamed Errington Court, and placed under the management of Haldin & Phillips Ltd.

In 1956, Errington Court was sold to Cia. de Nav. Penelope SA., Monrovia, Liberia and renamed Penelope. In 1961, she was sold to Dalia Cia. Nav. SA., Piraeus, Greece and was renamed Andromachi. She was operated under the management of  the Purvis Shipping Co. Ltd., London. She was transferred to the Greek flag in 1964, her port of registry was Andros. During the War of Attrition, she was damaged by Israeli shelling at Suez, Egypt on 25 June 1969 and set afire. The wreck was abandoned. It was scrapped in 1976 at Adabiya, Egypt.

References

1945 ships
Ships built in Dundee
Empire ships
Ministry of War Transport ships
Merchant ships of the United Kingdom
Steamships of Liberia
Merchant ships of Liberia
Steamships of Greece
Cargo ships of Greece
Maritime incidents in 1969
War of Attrition